Rush is an Italian science fiction and action film.

Synopsis
Rush is a solitary survivor, existing as a scavenger in a post-nuclear holocaust world. Water is scarce, as is plant life, and often fought to the death for. Rush discovers that water is being hoarded by the evil Yor and becomes a one-man army to save the world. Most of society is barely hanging on, living in tattered rags. Yor maintains order by using a well armed militia, the Untouchables and he is experimenting with ways to repopulate the Earth's plant population. Rush counters with his own group of freedom fighters.

Release
Rush was released in the United States in October 1984.

Reception
Variety referred to the film as a "minor, highly derivative Italian action picture in the science fiction genre". The review noted that the film "skimps on story and incident" and noted that several characters and scenes strongly resemble the film First Blood. Creature feature gave the movie one out of 5 stars, finding the action sequences unbelievable and the movie as a whole "super-chintzey." It also cited the Rambo resemblance. TV Guide called the movie stupid.

References

Sources

External links

1983 films
1980s science fiction action films
Italian science fiction action films
Films scored by Francesco De Masi
1980s Italian films
Italian post-apocalyptic films